The 2016 California Vulcans football team represented California University of Pennsylvania during the 2016 NCAA Division II football season.

The Vulcans recorded an 11–1 record overall and a 7–0 mark in Pennsylvania State Athletic Conference (PSAC) games. The Vulcans were PSAC West and league champions and made it to the Third Round of the NCAA Division II football championship.

Schedule

Roster

Season leaders

Offense
Rushing

Passing

Receiving

Defense
Only stats of players with 10 or more tackles

Special teams
Punting

Punt returns

Kick returns

References

California
California Vulcans football seasons
Pennsylvania State Athletic Conference football champion seasons
California Vulcans football